Polly Shortts is a hill on the outskirts of Pietermaritzburg, KwaZulu Natal, South Africa. Polly Shortts is named after a farmer who lived nearby, and whose help was often sought when after heavy rain, the road up the hill became muddy and impassable.

Polly Shortts is now famous because it is located on the route of the famous 90 km ultramarathon, the Comrades Marathon. Pollys, as it is known among participants, is about 2 kilometers long, is particularly steep and comes about 7 – 8 km from the end of the race in odd-numbered years (when it goes from Durban to Pietermaritzburg). Few runners outside the top ten manage the ascent without stopping to walk. In even-numbered years (Pietermaritzburg to Durban), Pollys is near the start of the race, and the runners must descend it.

Landforms of KwaZulu-Natal
Hills of South Africa